SS John Morgan was a World War II Liberty ship built by the Bethlehem Shipbuilding Corporation at their Bethlehem-Fairfield yard at Baltimore, Maryland, and launched on 4 May 1943. She was operated by the Wessel Duval & Company for the war.

John Morgan broke in two and sank immediately at position , but started fires aboard Montana. , engaged in gunnery practice in Chesapeake Bay, was sent to investigate. She sent a party aboard Montana to assist in extinguishing the fires, but recalled them after discovering that Montana was also carrying ammunition. Soon afterwards  and  arrived, and circled the area looking for survivors, but recovered only 12 bodies.

The wreck 
It is largely broken up, but the bow and a structure known as the "hospital" are still recognizable. The ship was on the United States lend-lease program and was loaded with war supplies such as Valentine tanks, P-39s, and large amounts of ammunition.

References 

 

1943 ships
Liberty ships
Ships built in Baltimore
Maritime incidents in June 1943
Ships sunk in collisions